The 2014 Open GDF Suez de Touraine was a professional tennis tournament played on indoor hard courts. It was the tenth edition of the tournament which was part of the 2014 ITF Women's Circuit, offering a total of $50,000 in prize money. It took place in Joué-lès-Tours, France, on 13–19 October 2014.

Singles main-draw entrants

Seeds 

 1 Rankings as of 6 October 2014

Other entrants 
The following players received wildcards into the singles main draw:
  Joséphine Boualem
  Lou Brouleau
  Nadiia Kichenok
  Jessika Ponchet

The following players received entry from the qualifying draw:
  Manon Arcangioli
  Jana Fett
  Pia König
  Adrijana Lekaj

Champions

Singles 

  Carina Witthöft def.  Urszula Radwańska 6–3, 7–6(8–6)

Doubles 

  Stéphanie Foretz /  Amandine Hesse def.  Alberta Brianti /  Maria Elena Camerin by default

External links 
 2014 Open GDF Suez de Touraine at ITFtennis.com
  

2014 ITF Women's Circuit
Open de Touraine
2014 in French tennis